The long-eared gymnure (Hylomys megalotis) is a eulipotyphlan that is found in Laos. This specific type of gymnure has long ears and a long skull compared to that of others. It is also recognized for its broad forefeet, stout claws, and naked hindfeet.

Etymology
The term Hylomys is referred as lesser gymnures. The term megalotis is derived from the two Greek words "megas" and "otos," which means "large" and "ears", respectively.

Taxonomic overview
Hylomys megalotis is from the family Erinaceidae. Some special physical features of Erinaceidae are that they have rounded bodies, pointed noses, and short tails. The members of Erinaceidae are considered to be omnivores, and some of their foods are insects, frogs, mice, fruits, and roots.

There are two types of Erinaceidae: Erinaceinae (hedgehog) and Galericinae (gymnure). Hedgehogs are nocturnals and have sharp, spiny fur on their backs. Furthermore, hedgehogs are usually found in Africa, Europe, and Asia. On the other hand, gymnures are diurnals and do not have spines. Instead, gymnures usually have stiff, bristly furs, and they produce a pungent smell when they feel threatened. Unlike hedgehogs, gymnures are usually found in South-East Asia and other tropical countries.

Reproduction
The pregnancy lasts around six to seven weeks. They are born blind and hairless. However, the hedgehogs can start growing spiny hairs within 36-hours after birth. Only the mothers raise their young ones.

Description
Hylomys megalotis is a type of gymnure. Compared to other Hylomys species, H. megalotis has rounder, more prominent, and larger ears. Its soles and tarsals are naked, and it has long and moderately stout claws. The skull of H. megalotis is elongated, flattened, and moderately slender.

Among the sizes of Hylomys, H. megalotis is medium in size. However, they have longer tail. Its tail is about 75% of its head and body length. Instead of having flattened spinous hairs, it has grey, long, soft and fine furs. Unlike other Hylomys species, H. megalotis has stronger and tougher teeth.

Habitat and conservation
Hylomys megalotis is primarily found in Khammouan Province, Laos, specifically in Khammouan Limestone National Biodiversity Conservation Area in Thakheck district. It can also be found in the surroundings of Ban Muang and Ban Doy. It is typically found in areas where there are massive limestone karst that is covered in large boulders, with heavily degraded mixture of deciduous forest, scrub, and bamboos.

Currently, there is no known threat to this species.

References

Hylomys
Mammals of Laos
Mammals of Asia
Endemic fauna of Laos
Mammals described in 2002